The 2004 Polish Speedway season was the 2004 season of motorcycle speedway in Poland.

Individual

Polish Individual Speedway Championship
The 2004 Individual Speedway Polish Championship final was held on 15 August at Częstochowa.

Golden Helmet
The 2004 Golden Golden Helmet organised by the Polish Motor Union (PZM) was the 2004 event for the league's leading riders. The final was held on the 9 October at Bydgoszcz.

Junior Championship
 winner - Janusz Kołodziej

Silver Helmet
 winner - Adrian Miedziński

Bronze Helmet
 winner - Adrian Miedziński

Pairs

Polish Pairs Speedway Championship
The 2004 Polish Pairs Speedway Championship was the 2004 edition of the Polish Pairs Speedway Championship. The final was held on 30 July at Toruń.

Team

Team Speedway Polish Championship
The 2004 Team Speedway Polish Championship was the 2004 edition of the Team Polish Championship. Unia Tarnów won the gold medal for the first time in their history.

Ekstraliga

1.Liga

2.Liga

Promotion/relegation play offs
Lublin - Zielona Góra 52–38, 31-59

Promotion/relegation additional round

References

Poland Individual
Poland Team
Speedway
2004 in Polish speedway